Selmir Pidro (born 3 March 1998) is a Bosnian professional footballer who plays as a left-back for Major League Soccer club St. Louis City and the Bosnia and Herzegovina national team.

Pidro started his professional career at Sarajevo, who loaned him to Bosna Visoko in 2018. In 2022, he was unveiled as St. Louis City’s first signing in Major League Soccer. 

A former youth international for Bosnia and Herzegovina, Pidro made his senior international debut in 2021.

Club career

Sarajevo
Pidro started playing at his hometown club Iskra Bugojno, before joining Sarajevo's youth academy in 2014. On 9 June 2017, he signed his first professional contract with the team.

In January 2018, he was sent on a six-month loan to Bosna Visoko. He made his professional debut against Orašje on 10 March at the age of 20. Three weeks later, he scored his first professional goal.

In August, following his return from loan, Pidro signed a new five-year contract with Sarajevo. He made his competitive debut for the team away at Sloboda Tuzla on 5 August. On 1 December, he scored his first goal for Sarajevo in a triumph over Čelik Zenica.

In April 2019, he suffered a severe knee injury, which was diagnosed as anterior cruciate ligament tear and was ruled out for at least six months.

Pidro won his first trophy with the club on 15 May, by beating Široki Brijeg in Bosnian Cup final.

On 9 July 2020, he extended his contract until June 2024.

St. Louis City SC
On 1 February 2022, it was announced that Pidro signed a pre-contract with St. Louis City SC team of Major League Soccer, who would begin play in 2023, through 2025, joining the second team first in July 2022.

International career
Pidro represented Bosnia and Herzegovina on various youth levels.

In March 2021, he received his first senior call-up, for friendly game against Costa Rica, and debuted in that game on 27 March.

Career statistics

Club

International

Honours
Sarajevo
Bosnian Premier League: 2018–19, 2019–20
Bosnian Cup: 2018–19, 2020–21

References

External links

1998 births
Living people
People from Bugojno
Bosniaks of Bosnia and Herzegovina
Bosnia and Herzegovina Muslims
Bosnia and Herzegovina footballers
Bosnia and Herzegovina youth international footballers
Bosnia and Herzegovina under-21 international footballers
Bosnia and Herzegovina international footballers
Association football fullbacks
FK Sarajevo players
NK Bosna Visoko players
First League of the Federation of Bosnia and Herzegovina players
Premier League of Bosnia and Herzegovina players
MLS Next Pro players